Darreh-ye Qir or Darreh Qir may refer to:
 Darreh Qir, Ramhormoz